The 2012–13 Eastern Washington Eagles men's basketball team represented Eastern Washington University during the 2012–13 NCAA Division I men's basketball season. The Eagles, led by second year head coach Jim Hayford, played their home games at Reese Court and were members of the Big Sky Conference. They finished the season 10–21, 7–13 in Big Sky play to finish in ninth place. They failed to qualify for the Big Sky tournament.

Roster

Schedule

|-
!colspan=9 style="background:#a10022; color:#FFFFFF;"| Exhibition

|-
!colspan=9 style="background:#a10022; color:#FFFFFF;"| Regular season

References

Eastern Washington Eagles men's basketball seasons
Eastern Washington
Eastern Washington
Eastern Washington